A parallax is the difference in the angular position of two stationary points relative to each other from different viewing positions. Parallax may also refer to:

Astronomy
Parsec (pc), parallax of one arcsecond with a baseline of 1 AU, and equal to 3.26 light years.
Dynamical parallax, a method of measuring the distance to a visual binary star
Photometric parallax method
Spectroscopic parallax
Stellar parallax, uses actual geometric parallax to determine distance

Business
Parallax, Inc. (company), designer and manufacturer of microcontrollers
Parallax Software, creator of the Descent series
Parallax Studio, film and animation studio based in the American Midwest
Parallax Graphics, a defunct high-spec video card manufacturer

People
Samuel Rowbotham (1816–1884), who used the pseudonym "Parallax" when promoting his notion of a "flat Earth".

Computer technology
Parallax mapping, a 3D graphics rendering technique
Parallax Propeller, a 32-bit microcontroller with eight CPU cores
Parallax scrolling, a scrolling technique in computer graphics

Popular media

Print
PARALLAX, a novel by Jon F. Merz
parallax (journal), an American academic journal on the topics for the disciplines of cultural studies, critical theory, and philosophy
Parallax: And Selected Poems by Sinéad Morrissey

Visual arts 
 Parallax barrier
 Parallax mapping

Comics
Parallax (comics), a DC comic book supervillain

Film
The Parallax View, a 1974 American film starring Warren Beatty.

Television
Parallax (TV series), children's science-fiction series
"Parallax" (Star Trek: Voyager), an episode of Star Trek: Voyager

Games
Parallax (video game), a 1986 game for Commodore 64 by Sensible Software
Parallax, a fictional organization from the video game 2064: Read Only Memories

Recorded music
Parallax (Greg Howe album), 1995 album by Greg Howe
Parallax (Atlas Sound album), 2011 album by Atlas Sound
Parallax, Norwegian band
The Parallax: Hypersleep Dialogues, 2011 EP by Between the Buried and Me
The Parallax II: Future Sequence, 2012 album by Between the Buried and Me